The curling competition of the 2014 Winter Olympics was held at the Ice Cube Curling Center, nicknamed "the Ice Cube". It is the sixth time that curling was on the Olympic program. In both the men's and women's competitions, ten nations competed. These two events took place from 10 to 21 February 2014.

The Canadian women's team went through the whole competition undefeated, the first time this has happened in an Olympic women's curling competition.  Additionally, both the Canadian men's and women's teams won the gold medal, becoming the first country to do so in the history of the event.

Medal summary

Medal table

Medal events

Qualification

Qualification to the curling tournaments at the Winter Olympics was determined through two methods. Nations could qualify teams by earning qualification points from performances at the 2012 and 2013 World Curling Championships. Teams could also qualify through an Olympic qualification event which was held in the autumn of 2013. Seven nations qualified teams via World Championship qualification points, while two nations qualified through the qualification event. As host nation, Russia qualified teams automatically, thus making a total of ten teams per gender in the curling tournaments.

Participating nations
Twelve nations participated, with the number of athletes participating per nation in parentheses. South Korea made its Olympic curling debut.

Results summary

Men

Round robin
The men's curling competition began with a round-robin tournament, where every team played every other team. The top four teams from the round robin advanced to the playoffs.
Standings

Results

Playoffs
The top four teams at the conclusion of the round robin advanced to the playoffs. The fourth seed was determined by a tiebreaker game between Norway and Great Britain, which Great Britain won with a score of 6–5.

Bronze medal game
Friday, 21 February, 12:30 pm

Gold medal game
Friday, 21 February, 5:30 pm

Women

Round robin
The women's curling competition began with a round-robin tournament, where every team played every other team. The top four teams from the round robin advanced to the playoffs.
Standings

Results

Playoffs
The top four teams at the conclusion of the round robin advanced to the playoffs.

Bronze medal game
Thursday, 20 February, 12:30

Gold medal game
Thursday, 20 February, 17:30

References

External links
Official Results Book – Curling

 
2014 Winter Olympics events
2014
2014 in curling
International curling competitions hosted by Russia